Hartje is a surname. Notable people with the surname include:

Chris Hartje (1915–1946), American baseball player
Tod Hartje (born 1968), American ice hockey player